Angela Marina (born 27 April 1999) is a Canadian Paralympic swimmer who competes in international level events.

References

External links
 
 
 

1999 births
Living people
Paralympic swimmers of Canada
Sportspeople from Brantford
Medalists at the 2019 Parapan American Games
Swimmers at the 2020 Summer Paralympics
Canadian female backstroke swimmers
Canadian female butterfly swimmers
Canadian female freestyle swimmers
S14-classified Paralympic swimmers
20th-century Canadian women
21st-century Canadian women